The 1962 Argentine Primera División was the 71st season of top-flight football in Argentina. The season began on March 25 and ended on December 12.

Boca Juniors won its 14th championship, with Ferro C. Oeste and Quilmes being relegated to Primera B by the average system.

League standings

See also
1962 in Argentine football

References

Argentine Primera División seasons
Argentine Primera Division
1962 in Argentine football